= Wadi Khudra =

Wadi Khudra is a narrow wadi and gorge in the Sinai Peninsula in Egypt.
